Coleophora sexdentatella is a moth of the family Coleophoridae. It is found in Canada, including Nova Scotia.

The larvae feed on the seeds of Juncus canadensis. They create a tubular silken seed case.

References

sexdentatella
Moths of North America
Moths described in 1958